Balep korkun is a type of bread that is consumed mainly in central Tibet. It is round, flat and relatively easy to make. The ingredients are tsampa (barley flour), water and baking powder. It is cooked in a frying pan. It has been described as similar in appearance to naan.

See also
 List of quick breads
 List of Tibetan dishes

References

Flatbreads
Quick breads
Tibetan cuisine